Joanna of Austria may refer to:

 Joanna of Austria, Princess of Portugal (1535–1573)
 Joanna of Austria, Grand Duchess of Tuscany (1547–1578)